Rosemary Brown (born 11 April 1961) is an Australian swimmer. She competed in six events at the 1980 Summer Olympics.

References

External links
 

1961 births
Living people
Australian female freestyle swimmers
Olympic swimmers of Australia
Swimmers at the 1980 Summer Olympics
Place of birth missing (living people)
Commonwealth Games medallists in swimming
Commonwealth Games silver medallists for Australia
Commonwealth Games bronze medallists for Australia
Swimmers at the 1978 Commonwealth Games
20th-century Australian women
21st-century Australian women
Medallists at the 1978 Commonwealth Games